Isla Santa Catalina, officially known as Isla Catalana, is an island in the Gulf of California east of the Baja California Peninsula. The island is uninhabited and is part of the Loreto Municipality.

The island is located south of the Gulf of California and is located 25 km from the peninsula of Baja California. It has about 13 km long and 4 km wide maximum with total area of 39.273 square kilometers. Isla Catalana, being uninhabited, is separated by the sea from the nearest town, Loreto, which lies about 60 km away.

Official name 
The official and traditional name of the island is “Isla Catalana”.  The confusion was caused by some documents of cartographic service of the United States, that wrote in a chart the name “Isla Santa Catalina”.In some scientific papers, authors use both names. The official Mexican name of Isla catalana, and the one that became internationally spread by error.

Biology

Flora 
Ferocactus diguetii.
This previous variety of cactus discovered by Leon Diguet and endemic to the islands of the Sea of Cortés, grows the tallest specimens on Isla Catalana.

Fauna

Birds
Picoides scalaris
Melanerpes uropygialis
Zenaida asiatica
Amphispiza bilineata
Cardinalis cardinalis
Haemorhous mexicanus

Reptiles

Isla Catalana has 10 species of reptiles, including the following seven endemic species.
Aspidoscelis catalinensis (Isla Santa Catalina whiptail) 
Crotalus catalinensis (Santa Catalina Island rattlesnake) 
Dipsosaurus catalinensis (Isla Santa Catalina desert iguana) 
Lampropeltis catalinensis (Isla Santa Catalina kingsnake)
Phyllodactylus bugastrolepis (Santa Catalina Island leaf-toed gecko)
Sceloporus lineatulus (Isla Santa Catalina spiny lizard)
Uta squamata (Isla Santa Catalina side-blotched lizard)

See also

 Nicolás de Cardona
 Tomás de Cardona

References

External links 
 Island's location map

Islands of Baja California Sur
Islands of the Gulf of California
Loreto Municipality (Baja California Sur)
Uninhabited islands of Mexico
Islands of Mexico